Olof Agne Laurentius Holmström (29 December 1893 – 22 October 1949) was a Swedish sprinter who competed at the 1920 Summer Olympics. He won a bronze medal in the 4 × 100 m relay, but failed to reach the finals of individual 100 m and 200 m events.

In 1917 Holmström won Swedish titles in the 100 m, 200 m, 4 × 100 m and standing high jump events. After retiring from competitions he worked as a sports teacher, and between 1930 and 1949 was secretary-general of the Swedish Gymnastics Federation. He was responsible for the Lingiadem, major gymnastic events that were held in Stockholm in 1939 and 1949 in honor of the founder of Swedish gymnastics, Pehr Henrik Ling. The 1949 event was a sporting success, but a financial fiasco. Unable to handle the criticism, Holmström committed suicide by jumping from the Katarina Elevator.

References

1893 births
1949 deaths
Sportspeople from Lund
Swedish male sprinters
Athletes (track and field) at the 1920 Summer Olympics
Olympic athletes of Sweden
Olympic bronze medalists for Sweden
Medalists at the 1920 Summer Olympics
Olympic bronze medalists in athletics (track and field)
Suicides by jumping in Sweden
20th-century Swedish people